Sexwitch is a musical collaboration between the English rock band Toy and Natasha Khan (Bat for Lashes). Their self-titled album was released on 25 September 2015, and consists of six cover versions of 1970s psychedelic and folk songs from Iran, Morocco, Thailand and the United States.

Recording 
Khan and Toy had previously collaborated in 2013 to cover "The Bride", a pre-revolution Iranian song. For Sexwitch, Khan and producer Dan Carey bought several "old weird psych records from different countries, strange folk mountain songs", and invited Toy to record cover versions of the songs. The band learned the songs and recorded them in a single take in one day.

Release 
On 24 August 2015, Sexwitch released a single, "Helelyos", online. Rolling Stone described it as a "hypnotic, Middle Eastern-infused groove". The Guardian said Sexwitch comprised "hypnotic, groove-based tracks that feature jagged post-punk guitars" and "shrieking crescendos". Sexwitch played their festival debut at Green Man in 2015.

Sexwitch track list

References

Musical groups from Brighton and Hove